Robert John O'Neill,  (born 5 November 1936) is an Australian historian and academic. He is chair of the International Academic Advisory Committee at the United States Studies Centre at the University of Sydney, was director of the International Institute for Strategic Studies, based in London, from 1982 to 1987, and Chichele Professor of the History of War at the University of Oxford from 1987 to 2000.

Early life and education
O'Neill graduated from the Royal Military College, Duntroon in 1958, and from 1958 to 1969 served as an officer in the Australian Army. His service included a tour of the Vietnam War as an infantry captain with the 5th Battalion, Royal Australian Regiment from 1966 to 1967, during which he was Mentioned in Despatches. In 1965, he completed his Doctor of Philosophy thesis at the University of Oxford on "The Relationship between the German Army and the Nazi Party, 1933–9" under the direction of one of his predecessors as Chichele Professor of the History of War, N. H. Gibbs. The research for O'Neill's thesis formed the basis for his first book, The German Army and the Nazi Party, 1933–1939, published in 1966.

Academic career
O'Neill served as senior lecturer in history, Royal Military College, Duntroon, 1968–69. He was head of the Strategic and Defence Studies Centre, Australian National University in 1971–82, senior fellow in international relations, 1969–77, professorial fellow, 1977–82, Australian official historian of the Korean War from 1970 until 1982, director of the International Institute for Strategic Studies (1982–87), and Chichele Professor of the History of War at the University of Oxford (1987–2001). 

He was the founding chairman of the Australian Strategic Policy Institute (2000–05). He was chair of the International Academic Advisory Committee at the United States Studies Centre, University of Sydney (2008–11). He was chairman of trustees of the Imperial War Museum, London, 1998–2001 (Trustee 1990–98). He was chairman of the Council of the International Institute for Strategic Studies, 1996–2001 (council member 1977–82, 1992–96).

Awards
Officer of the Order of Australia, in the Australia Day Honours of 1988.
Centenary Medal, in 2001.
Fellow of the Australian Institute of International Affairs.
Fellow of the Academy of Social Sciences in Australia.
Fellow of the Institute of Engineers, Australia

Published works

Author

Editor
The strategic nuclear balance: an Australian perspective, edited by O'Neill (1975)
The Defence of Australia: fundamental new aspects, the proceedings of a conference organized by the Strategic and Defence Studies Centre, The Australian National University, October 1976, edited by O'Neill (1976)
New directions in strategic thinking, edited by O'Neill and D.M. Horner (1981)
Security in East Asia, edited by O'Neill (1984)
The Conduct of East-West relations in the 1980s, edited by  O'Neill (1985)
New technology and western security policy, edited by  O'Neill (1985)
Doctrine, the Alliance and arms control, edited by O'Neill (1986)
East Asia, the West and international security, edited by  O'Neill (1987); 
Hedley Bull on arms control, selected and introduced by O'Neill and David N. Schwartz (1987)
Prospects for security in the Mediterranean, edited by O'Neill (1988); 
The West and the Third World: essays in honour of J. D. B. Miller, edited by O'Neill and R.J. Vincent (1990); 
Securing peace in Europe, 1945–62: thoughts for the post–Cold War era, edited by O'Neill and Beatrice Heuser (1992); 
War, strategy, and international politics: essays in honour of Sir Michael Howard edited by O'Neill, Lawrence Freedman and Paul Hayes (1992); 
Alternative nuclear futures: the role of nuclear weapons in the post–cold war world, edited by O'Neill and John Baylis (2000);

References

External links
 Transcript of an interview with Robert O'Neill at The Australians at War Film Archive
 United States Studies Centre

1936 births
Military personnel from Melbourne
Alumni of Brasenose College, Oxford
Australian Army officers
Australian military historians
Australian military personnel of the Vietnam War
Academic staff of the Australian National University
Australian Rhodes Scholars
Chichele Professors of the History of War
Fellows of All Souls College, Oxford
Fellows of the Academy of the Social Sciences in Australia
Living people
Officers of the Order of Australia
Royal Military College, Duntroon graduates
University of Melbourne alumni